Kooyong is a suburb in Melbourne, Victoria, Australia, 7 km south-east of Melbourne's Central Business District, located within the City of Stonnington local government area. Kooyong recorded a population of 842 at the 2021 census.

Kooyong is the second most expensive suburb of Melbourne, with a median house price of $3.585 million.

Kooyong takes its name from Kooyong Koot Creek, which was the original name given to Gardiners Creek by the government surveyor, Robert Hoddle, in 1837. It is thought that the name derives from an Aboriginal word meaning camp or resting place, or haunt of the wild fowl. It is best known for being the site of Kooyong Stadium.

History

Kooyong Post Office opened on 18 March 1912.

Population

In the 2016 census, there were 817 people in Kooyong. 72.2% of people were born in Australia and 80.5% of people spoke only English at home. The most common responses for religion were No Religion 29.7%, Catholic 23.1% and Anglican 16.9%.

Transport

The suburb is serviced by the Kooyong railway station, as well as tram route 16.

Sport

Malvern City Soccer club are located in Kooyong and play their home games at Sir Zelman Cowen Park.

Malvern Braves Baseball Club are also located at Sir Zelman Cowen Park.

See also
 City of Malvern – Kooyong was previously within this former local government area.

References

Suburbs of Melbourne
Suburbs of the City of Stonnington